Elwin Wilburn "Wink" Midgett (December 31, 1911 – November 22, 1993) was an American football and basketball coach and was an accounting professor. He served as the head football coach at Middle Tennessee State University from 1940 to 1946, compiling a record of 18–11–3. Midgett was also the head basketball coach at Middle Tennessee from 1939 to 1942, tallying a mark of 25–35. He was also a professor of accounting at the school.

Midgett was a standout three-sport athlete at Tennessee Technological University in Cookeville, Tennessee. He was born on December 31, 1911, in Watertown, Tennessee, to Edel Wilburn and Mattie Ellis Midgett. He died on November 22, 1993, at his home in Murfreesboro, Tennessee.

Head coaching record

Football

References

External links
 

1911 births
1993 deaths
American men's basketball players
Middle Tennessee Blue Raiders football coaches
Middle Tennessee Blue Raiders men's basketball coaches
Tennessee Tech Golden Eagles baseball players
Tennessee Tech Golden Eagles football players
Tennessee Tech Golden Eagles men's basketball players
Middle Tennessee State University faculty
People from Watertown, Tennessee
Coaches of American football from Tennessee
Players of American football from Tennessee
Baseball players from Tennessee
Basketball coaches from Tennessee
Basketball players from Tennessee